Movali Najaf Chalaveh (also Romanized as Movālī Najaf Chālāveh) is a village in Qalkhani Rural District, Gahvareh District, Dalahu County, Kermanshah Province, Iran. At the 2006 census, its population was 195, in 42 families.

References 

Populated places in Dalahu County